The Nandi Award for Best Fight Master winners since 1999:

References

Fight Master